Matei Christian Ilie (born 11 December 2002) is a Romanian professional footballer who plays as a centre back for  club Padova.

Club career

Padova
He made his Serie C debut  on 10 September 2022 in a game against Vicenza.

Career statistics

Club

Honours 

Padova
 Coppa Italia Serie C: 2021–22

References

External links
 

2002 births
Living people
Sportspeople from Piatra Neamț
Romanian footballers
Association football defenders
Serie C players
Calcio Padova players
Romanian expatriate footballers
Romanian expatriate sportspeople in Italy
Expatriate footballers in Italy
Romania youth international footballers